Jean-Pierre Junior Nsame (born 1 May 1993) is a Cameroonian professional footballer who plays as a forward for Swiss Super League club Young Boys and the Cameroon national team.

Club career

France
Nsame made his professional debut in April 2012 for Angers in a 1–1 Ligue 2 draw against Metz. He made 23 appearances for Angers over four seasons with the club and also enjoyed loan spells with Carquefou and Amiens in the Championnat National.

At the end of the 2015–16 season, having failed to break into the first team on a regular basis, Nsame was released by the club. In July 2016, Nsame went on trial at English League One side Walsall and played in a 2–1 friendly defeat to Norwich City. However, after negative details emerged about his past, he was released by the club.

Switzerland

Servette 
On 23 August 2016, Nsame signed for Swiss Challenge League side Servette. He finished as the league's top goalscorer with 23 goals, helping the club to an impressive third place finish after their promotion the previous season.

Young Boys 
His goals attracted interest from other clubs and in July 2017, after only one year in Geneva, he joined Young Boys of the Swiss Super League. In his first season, he was part of the Young Boys squad that won the Super League title for the first time in 32 years. They clinched the title with a 2–1 win over Luzern on 28 April 2018, with Nsame scoring an 89th minute winner. He helped the club retain their title the following campaign, scoring 15 goals in 31 league appearances.

On 14 September 2019, Nsame netted his first hat-trick for the club in an 11–2 victory over fifth division side FC Freienbach in the second round of the Swiss Cup. Five days later, he scored his first goal in European competition in a 2–1 defeat to Portuguese side FC Porto in the group stage of the Europa League. On 24 November, he scored a hat-trick in a 4–3 win over FC Sion in the Swiss Super League; the match also saw Pajtim Kasami score a hat-trick for Sion.

In the 2019–20 Swiss Super league season Nsame finished the season as the league's top goalscorer with 32 goals in 32 matches and powered the Young Boys to winning the Swiss double, by winning the Swiss League for the 3rd straight time and the Swiss Cup.

Loan to Venezia
On 31 January 2022, Nsame joined Italian club Venezia on loan until the end of the 2021–22 season, with an option to buy.

International career
Nsame was called up to the Cameroon squad for the 2017 Confederations Cup.

He earned his first cap for Cameroon when he started their match against Nigeria on 4 September 2017 in a qualifying match for the 2018 World Cup.

On 9 November 2022, he was named in the final squad for the 2022 FIFA World Cup in Qatar.

Personal life
His family name is correctly spelled Nsame, not Nsamé.

Career statistics

Honours
Young Boys
Swiss Super League: 2017–18, 2018–19, 2019–20, 2020–21
Swiss Cup: 2019–20

Individual
Swiss Super League Player of the Year: 2019–20, 2020–21
Swiss Super League Team of the Year: 2019–20, 2020–21
Swiss Super League Top goalscorer: 2019–20, 2020–21 
Swiss Super League Goal of the Year: 2016–17 
Swiss Cup Top goalscorer: 2019–20 
Swiss Challenge League Top goalscorer: 2016–17

References

External links

Jean-Pierre Nsame foot-national.com Profile

1993 births
Living people
Cameroonian footballers
French footballers
French sportspeople of Cameroonian descent
Association football forwards
Ligue 1 players
Ligue 2 players
Championnat National players
Swiss Super League players
Serie A players
Angers SCO players
USJA Carquefou players
Amiens SC players
Servette FC players
BSC Young Boys players
Venezia F.C. players
2022 FIFA World Cup players
Cameroonian expatriate footballers
Cameroonian expatriate sportspeople in Switzerland
Expatriate footballers in Switzerland
Cameroonian expatriate sportspeople in Italy
Expatriate footballers in Italy